02 may refer to:

 The year 2002, or any year ending with 02
 The month of February
 2 (number)
 02 (Son of Dave album), 2006
 02 (Urban Zakapa album), 2012
 The number of the French department Aisne
 0², the secret final boss of Kirby 64: The Crystal Shards (2000)
 Zero Two, a character from the anime and manga series Darling in the Franxx (2018–2020)

See also
O2 (disambiguation)
Q2 (disambiguation) 
2Q (disambiguation)